This is a list of notable private security companies.

Africa

Nigeria 
Halogen Group Nigeria

South Africa 
Bidvest Protea Coin

Oceania

Australia 
 Paladin Group (private military contractor)
 Wilson Security

Asia

India
 IViz Security
 Security & Intelligence Services Pvt Ltd

Israel 
 Mikud

Japan
 Secom

Europe

Denmark
 ISS A/S

Ireland
 Integrated Risk Management Services

Spain
 Prosegur

Sweden
 Securitas AB

Switzerland

 ImmuniWeb
 Securitas AB
 Securitas AG

United Kingdom

 Aegis Defense Services
 Control Risks
 Corps of Commissionaires
 G4S
 International Intelligence Limited
 Intelligent (UK Holdings) Limited
 Rubicon International Services

Poland
K securities

Americas

Canada 
 GardaWorld

United States 
 ADT Security Services
 Allied Universal
 G4S Secure Solutions
 Inter-Con Security
 Monitronics
 Paragon Systems
 Pinkerton
 Vivint

See also
 List of private military companies
 Computer security companies (category)

References

Security